Edrit Jaqueline Viana Silva (born 12 January 1996) is a Uruguayan footballer who plays as a forward. She has been a member of the Uruguay women's national team.

Club career
Viana played in Uruguay for Colón and Peñarol.

International career
Viana played for Uruguay at senior level in the 2014 Copa América Femenina.

References 

1996 births
Living people
Women's association football forwards
Uruguayan women's footballers
Afro-Uruguayan
Uruguay women's international footballers
Colón F.C. players
Peñarol players